Garbatka-Zbyczyn  is a village in the administrative district of Gmina Garbatka-Letnisko, within Kozienice County, Masovian Voivodeship, in east-central Poland.

See also
Garbatka, Garbatka Długa, Garbatka-Dziewiątka, Garbatka-Letnisko

References

External links
 
 
 

Villages in Kozienice County